Nautical Almanac Office may refer to:

 HM Nautical Almanac Office, in the United Kingdom
 The Nautical Almanac Office, at the United States Naval Observatory

See also
 NAO (disambiguation)